Paduppu is a small hamlet in Karivedakam village in Kasaragod District, Kerala, India.which is home for the most popular youth club in Kasaragod district,(UNITED PADUPPU ARTS AND SPORTS CLUB)  from Kanhangad and  from Kasaragod.

Schools and colleges
GLP School Thavanath
Sanjos English Medium
Safa Public School
ALP School Sankarampady
San Geo Central school

Holy places
St. George Church
Badar Juma Masjid Paduppu
Sree Dharma Sastha Bhajana Mandiram

Transportation
This village is connected to Karnataka state through Poinachi- Bandaduka-Sulya road. There is a 20km distance between Bandaduka to Sullia in Karnataka from where Bangalore and Mysore can be easily accessed. Locations in Kerala can be accessed by driving towards the western side. The nearest railway station is Kanhangad railway station on Mangalore-Palakkad line. There are international  airports at Mangalore and Kannur.

References

Panathur area